T series or T-Series may refer to:

Technology
 Apple T series, a family of processors
 Canon T series, a line of single lens reflex cameras
 Juniper T series, a core router 
 Sony Ericsson T series, a series of cell phones
 SPARC T series, a range of multi-core microprocessors made by Sun Microsystems and Oracle
 ThinkPad T series, a line of laptop computers produced by IBM and Lenovo

Transportation

Vehicles
 Bentley T-Series, a 1965–1980 British luxury car series
 FTE T-Series, a 1998–2002 Australian performance car lineup based on the Ford Falcon
 Scania T-series, a 2004–2005 Swedish truck series
 Suzuki T series, a 1963–1977 Japanese motorcycle series
 Isuzu D-Max, a 2002–present Japanese mid-size pickup truck, sold in Egypt as the Chevrolet T-Series

Engines
 Rover T-Series engine, a 1992–1999 British inline-four petrol engine series

Mass transportation
 T series (Toronto subway), a series of subway cars built in the 1990s for Toronto, Ontario, Canada

Other uses
 T-Series (company), an Indian record label and film production company

See also
 T class (disambiguation)
 T-type (disambiguation)